The 1954–55 season saw Rochdale compete for their 27th season in the Football League Third Division North.

Statistics
																				
																				

|}

Final League Table

Competitions

Football League Third Division North

F.A. Cup

Lancashire Cup

References

Rochdale A.F.C. seasons
Rochdale